Sir Horace Kadoorie, CBE (28 September 1902 – 22 April 1995) was an industrialist, hotelier, and philanthropist.

Early life and education
In 1913–14, he spent a year at Clifton College  and was a member of Polacks House, a boarding house solely for Jewish boys at Clifton.

Personal life

His father was Sir Elly Kadoorie, and his uncle, Sir Ellis Kadoorie. His family were originally Iraqi Jews from Baghdad who later migrated to Bombay, British Raj India, in the mid-18th century. Kadoorie and his brother, Sir Lawrence Kadoorie, worked for Victor Sassoon during the 1920s and 1930s, and managed his Shanghai hotel. They also worked for their father, the industrialist Sir Elly Kadoorie. 

He and his brother formed an agricultural aid organisation that in the 1960s helped hundreds of thousands of peasants in rural areas of Hong Kong to become independent farmers. Kadoorie and his brother, Lawrence, both received the Magsaysay Award for public service in 1962. 

They were also appointed Chevaliers of the Légion d'honneur by the French government. The Nepal Government awarded him one of its highest honours, the Gorkha Dakshin Bahu (First Class) Award, for his work in helping Gurkha soldiers readjust to rural life after leaving the British military. Sir Horace Kadoorie died in Hong Kong on 22 April 1995. 

He was buried in the Jewish Cemetery in Happy Valley, Hong Kong.

Philanthropy
Among Sir Horace's philanthropies was a school that became a haven for Jewish refugee children in the Shanghai ghetto.

See also
Kadoorie family

References

1902 births
1995 deaths
Chevaliers of the Légion d'honneur
Commanders of the Order of the British Empire
Hong Kong Jews
Hong Kong people of Iraqi-Jewish descent
Hong Kong philanthropists
Jewish Chinese history
Jewish Nepalese history
Jewish philanthropists
Horace
Knights Bachelor
Members of the Order of Gorkha Dakshina Bahu, First Class
Mizrahi Jews
People educated at Clifton College
People from Baghdad
Ramon Magsaysay Award winners
20th-century philanthropists